Oakland University William Beaumont School of Medicine (OUWB) is the allopathic (MD) medical school for Oakland University (OU). The campus is located north of Detroit in central Oakland County, Michigan and spans the cities of Auburn Hills and Rochester Hills, but has the mailing address of nearby but not adjacent Rochester. OUWB is named for OU which was named for Oakland County and William Beaumont Hospital (WBH) which was named for US Army surgeon William Beaumont who became known as the "Father of Gastric Physiology" following his research on human digestion started at Fort Mackinac on Mackinac Island, Michigan. WBH's original name was "Oakland Hospital" (as it was being built) named for the county. But to distinguish itself from nearby Oakwood Hospital, Oakland Hospital changed its name just before officially opening for business.

History
This allopathic (MD) medical school was first planned for with founding partner William Beaumont Health System (WBHS) in 2007. OUWB was later founded in 2008 with the first class starting in the fall of 2011. OUWB is the fourth medical school in the US State of Michigan and the first new medical school in the state in 47 years. Over 3,000 prospective students applied for the 50 seats in the first class. In 2012, OUWB added 75 new students, with 100 more joining in 2013 and 2014 each for a total of 325 students. In 2015, OUWB received full accreditation from the LCME. In March 2015, OUWB's Charter Class achieved a 100% match rate when matching to their residency positions.

Future
The school currently graduates approximately 125 MD physicians each year. New dedicated buildings for OUWB are being planned on both OU and WBHS's various campuses.

Beaumont Health 
Beaumont Health  was founded 2 years earlier than Oakland University in 1955. System-wide WBHS operates 1,738 beds at 3 hospital locations (1,070 beds at William Beaumont Hospital, Royal Oak, 418 beds at William Beaumont Hospital, Troy, 250 beds at William Beaumont Hospital, Grosse Pointe) and many clinics, rehabilitation centers, and affiliated doctor offices in Metro Detroit. William Beaumont Hospital, Royal Oak is nationally ranked in 9 adult specialties and is the 3rd largest provider of Medicare in the US and one of the largest hospitals in the country. Beaumont operates the only Level I Trauma Center in Oakland or Macomb Counties, an area of about 2 million people. WBHS also has air medical transportation service called Beaumont One.

In addition to OUWBSM, WBHS is also a teaching hospital for Wayne State University School of Nursing, and Michigan State University School of Nursing.

References

External links

William Beaumont Health System
Oakland University

Oakland University campus
Medical schools in Michigan